Awaba Airport  is an airfield serving Awaba, in the Western Province of Papua New Guinea.

Airlines and destinations

References

External links
 

Airports in Papua New Guinea
Western Province (Papua New Guinea)